Owlwood Estate is a historic mansion in Holmby Hills, Los Angeles, California. It was built in 1936 and designed by architect Robert D. Farquhar. Previous owners include actors Tony Curtis and Cher.

Description 
The  Tuscan-style mansion was designed by architect Robert D. Farquhar (1872–1967) in 1937, and was the largest house in Los Angeles when it was built. It has two stories, six bedrooms and two staff bedrooms, seven full bathrooms and five half-bathrooms, a tennis court, a pool house, a swimming pool, a theatre, and a full-size elevator.

It is located at 141 South Carolwood Drive, Holmby Hills, Los Angeles, California.

History

Construction and first owners 
The first owners were businessman Charles H. Quinn (1876–1975) and his wife, Florence Letts Quinn (1868–1944), the widow of Arthur Letts (1862–1923), the original developer of Holmby Hills. Arthur Letts chose 141 South Carolwood Drive from all the development's acreage for his family's estate. However, he died before building commenced, and his widow inherited the property, a 3.7-acre lot at the end of a cul-de-sac bordering the Los Angeles Country Club. It was the only property excluded from the original Holmby Hills offerings. Florence Letts selected prominent architect Robert D. Farquhar to design and build the estate, and was responsible for the European influences seen in the selections and finishes.

Subsequent owners 
The second owner, Texas entrepreneur Joseph Drown, founder of the Hotel Bel Air, only lived at 141 South Carolwood for two years and made no major changes to the estate. The third owner was Joe Schenck (1878–1961), the first president of United Artists and chairman of 20th Century Fox. During his ownership, Marilyn Monroe, a close friend, was a regular visitor. He sold the estate in 1956 to William Keck of Superior Oil.

In the 1960s, Tony Curtis (1925–2010) purchased the estate from Mr. Keck. In 1967, Sonny Bono (1935–1998) and Cher attended a birthday party at the estate; Cher fell in love with the estate but Curtis refused to sell his beloved Carolwood. But when he began filming in London a few years later, he called Cher. She and Sonny purchased the estate and she began an extensive design project. When it was completed, Architectural Digest featured 141 South Carolwood Drive in the May/June 1974.

In 1976, Cher sold the estate to Chase and Ralph Mishkin, who renamed it "Owlwood", in honor of the owls that lived in the towering trees on the property. After only two years, they sold Owlwood to the eighth owner, Ghazi Alta, an investor from Monaco. Alta then acquired the neighboring 4.6-acre estate at 10060 Sunset Boulevard, which had been owned by Bill Osco, the producer of Flash Gordon, and prior to that the Olympic swimmer and actress Esther Williams. Alta sold 141 South Carolwood Drive and 10060 Sunset Boulevard to Dawn and Roland Arnall in 2002. They added an adjacent estate at 10010 Sunset Boulevard, and the street, South Carolwood Drive, to the original estate.

In 2016, Owlwood, known as "The Crown Jewel of Holmby Hills," was quietly shown to vetted buyers as a private off-market listing at a sales price of $150 million. Owlwood was never listed for sale in the MLS, publicized or advertised.

Ownership by investment firms 
In September 2016, the Owlwood estate sold for 90 million to Sturmer Pippin Investments, LLC. Bob Shapiro, head of Sturmer Pippin Investments and Woodbridge Luxury Homes, said he intended to honor the property's legendary past. In 2016, the Owlwood purchase set the record as the third highest residential sale in Los Angeles history and represented the 2016 highest off-market private sale in Los Angeles.

In July 2017, the Owlwood Estate returned to the Los Angeles real estate market, listed for sale at $180 million.

In December 2017, the Securities and Exchange Commission filed suit against the Woodbridge Group of companies, which had bought Owlwood, and Bob Shapiro, alleging that Woodbridge and its associated companies operated as a Ponzi scheme.

See also

References 

Houses in Los Angeles
Houses completed in 1937
Holmby Hills, Los Angeles